Abdelrazaq Al Hussain (born 15 September 1986, in Aleppo) is a Syrian footballer who plays as a midfielder for Saudi Arabian club Al-Ansar and the Syria national team.

Career

Club career 
Al Hussain's career began in the youth system of Al-Hurriya before starting his professional career with the senior team. He moved to Syrian League club Al-Jaish in 2006. In August 2010, he transferred to SPL club Al-Karamah. Al Hussain moved to Saudi Professional League club Al-Taawon in July 2011 but the contract has been dissolved in February 2012. Al Hussain then moved to Iraq and signed a contract with Arbil SC.

International career 
Al Hussain was a part of the Syrian Under-19 national team that finished in Fourth place in the 2004 AFC U-19 Championship in Malaysia and he was a part of the Syrian U-20 national team in the 2005 FIFA U-20 World Cup in the Netherlands.
He plays against Canada and Italy in the group-stage of the FIFA U-20 World Cup and against Brazil in the Round of 16. He scored one goal in the second match of the group-stage against Italy.

He has been a regular for the Syrian national football team since 2006. Al Hussain was selected to Valeriu Tiţa's 23-man final squad for the 2011 AFC Asian Cup in Qatar and he started the opening group game against Saudi Arabia and scored Syria's two goals in a 2–1 victory. He played the remaining two group games against Japan and Jordan.

International statistics
Scores and results table. Syria's goal tally first:

|}

Honour and titles

Club 
Al-Jaish Damascus
 Syrian Premier League: 2009–10

National Team 
 AFC U-19 Championship 2004: Fourth place
 FIFA U-20 World Cup 2005: Round of 16
 Nehru Cup: 2009 Runners-up

References

External links 
 

1986 births
Living people
Sportspeople from Aleppo
Syrian footballers
Association football midfielders
Hurriya SC players
Al-Jaish Damascus players
Al-Karamah players
Al-Taawoun FC players
Erbil SC players
Dibba Al-Hisn Sports Club players
Hatta Club players
Dibba FC players
Al-Riyadh SC players
Al Ahed FC players
Nejmeh SC players
Al-Nasr SC (Salalah) players
Al-Ansar FC (Medina) players
Syrian Premier League players
Saudi Professional League players
Iraqi Premier League players
UAE Pro League players
UAE First Division League players
Saudi First Division League players
Lebanese Premier League players
Oman Professional League players
Syria international footballers
Footballers at the 2006 Asian Games
2011 AFC Asian Cup players
Asian Games competitors for Syria
Syrian expatriate footballers
Syrian expatriate sportspeople in Saudi Arabia
Syrian expatriate sportspeople in Iraq
Syrian expatriate sportspeople in the United Arab Emirates
Syrian expatriate sportspeople in Lebanon
Syrian expatriate sportspeople in Oman
Expatriate footballers in Saudi Arabia
Expatriate footballers in Iraq
Expatriate footballers in the United Arab Emirates
Expatriate footballers in Lebanon
Expatriate footballers in Oman